Hu Xiaoxiao (born 16 July 1999) is a Chinese sailor. She competed in the Nacra 17 event at the 2020 Summer Olympics.

References

External links
 

1999 births
Living people
Chinese female sailors (sport)
Olympic sailors of China
Sailors at the 2020 Summer Olympics – Nacra 17
Place of birth missing (living people)